Sinclair User was a magazine dedicated to the Sinclair Research range of home computers, most specifically the ZX Spectrum (while also occasionally covering arcade games). Initially published by ECC Publications, and later EMAP, it was published in the UK between 1982 and 1993, and was the longest running Sinclair-based magazine. The magazine contained news, game reviews, previews, tips, help guides, columns, readers' letters, and cover-mounted game demos.

History

In earlier years, the magazine built up personality cults around some of its "hilariously" monikered staff, including Bill "Incorruptible" Scolding, John "Disgusting" Gilbert, Chris "Lunchbreaks" Bourne, Claire "Ligger" Edgely, Richard Price (writer of the "Gordo Greatbelly" adventure tips section), and columnist Andrew Hewson (founder of Hewson Consultants software).

Under David Kelly's editorial tenure, the magazine began to focus more on the gaming scene, and featured more colour graphics under designer Gareth "the Mad Celt". By the time of editor Graham Taylor, the magazine included the cartoon character Kamikaze Bear, and the tone of the publication changed from a semi-serious magazine to something aimed more at children.

In May 1992 the former rival publication CRASH was notionally subsumed into Sinclair User but in practice this meant little more than the addition of the Crash! logo to the magazine's cover page.

Timex Sinclair User

A short-lived spin-off known as Timex Sinclair User was also published for the American market, where versions of Sinclair computers were marketed under the Timex Sinclair name.

See also
Sinclair Programs
Your Sinclair

References

External links
Archived Sinclair User magazines on the Internet Archive
Mag-Slag,  humorous analysis of a typical Sinclair User review



Video game magazines published in the United Kingdom
Defunct computer magazines published in the United Kingdom
ZX Spectrum magazines
Magazines established in 1982
Magazines disestablished in 1993
Monthly magazines published in the United Kingdom
1983 establishments in the United Kingdom
1993 disestablishments in the United Kingdom
Magazines published in London